Firestone Stadium is a softball stadium in Akron, Ohio, United States. The stadium was dedicated on July 25, 1925, by Harvey Firestone, the founder of the Firestone Tire and Rubber Company.  It was owned and operated by the Firestone company until it was donated to the City of Akron in 1988. It has a seating capacity of 4,576.

From 1999 to 2017, it served as the home of the Akron Racers of the National Pro Fastpitch softball league. The stadium was also the site of the annual Mid-American Conference softball tournament from 2002 to 2005 and again from 2008 through 2019. It was scheduled to host the 2020 tournament, but the tournament was canceled in March 2020 because of the coronavirus pandemic. Subsequently, in May 2020 the Mid-American Conference announced that the softball tournament was one of eight conference tournaments that were eliminated for at least the next four seasons beginning in 2020–21.

Since 2009, Firestone Stadium has hosted the semifinals and finals of the Ohio High School Athletic Association (OHSAA) state softball tournament. The championship rounds include all four divisions of OHSAA softball, with 12 games played in three days in late May or early June. It was scheduled to again host the championship rounds June 4–6, 2020, but the tournament was cancelled in late April along with all other spring sports seasons and tournaments due to the coronavirus pandemic.

References

External links 

Softball venues in the United States
Baseball venues in Ohio
Sports venues in Akron, Ohio
Sports venues completed in 1925
1925 establishments in Ohio
Tourist attractions in Akron, Ohio